The Promenade Bolingbrook, also known as The Promenade, is a  open-air shopping center in Bolingbrook, Illinois, a southwest suburb of Chicago. It opened on April 26, 2007, at the intersection of Boughton Road and Interstate 355. Anchor tenants include Bass Pro Shops, Macy's, iPic Theaters, Binny's Beverage Depot, Barnes & Noble and DSW. It is owned and managed by M & J Wilkow. Macy's was originally planned to be a Marshall Field's while Binny's was a Circuit City which closed in 2009.

The Promenade Bolingbrook received LEED certification from the U.S. Green Building Council.

History

On May 21, 2002, Meijer opened on the shopping center's property, five years prior to its grand opening.

The Promenade Bolingbrook officially opened on April 26, 2007, with Macy's, Bass Pro Shops, Barnes & Noble, and Circuit City as initial anchors. Originally, Macy's was planned to be a Marshall Field's prior to Macy's rebranding all of their department stores under the Macy's banner.

In the fall of 2009, Gold Class Cinema would open to the public. It was renamed to iPic Theaters in 2011. On October 15, 2010, Binny's Beverage Depot opened in the former spot of Circuit City which went out of business in 2009.

Expansion 
Forest City is developing twenty-one acres adjacent to The Promenade Bolingbrook into a mixed-use residential/office development.  The development will include at least 160 apartments for low-income residents aged 55 or older.  The office space, which is planned to include at least three buildings and will take up 2/3 of the site, is being developed build-to-suit.  While construction on the first 80 units of the residential portion is scheduled for late 2009, the office development may take several years to begin, once market conditions rebound.

References

External links
 Official website
 Forest City Development Site

Forest City Realty Trust
Bolingbrook, Illinois
Shopping malls established in 2007
2007 establishments in Illinois
Shopping malls in Will County, Illinois
Lifestyle centers (retail)